Strictly Berlin is an exhibition series presenting Berlin media art, which was founded in 2006 by Heiko Daxl and Ingeborg Fülepp in co-operation with Noam Braslavsky in the Galerie der Künste (GdK) in Berlin.

Strictly Berlin takes place annually in Berlin.

External links 
 strictly berlin
 Videochannel Strictly Berlin

Contemporary art exhibitions
Installation art
Digital art
Video art
Culture in Berlin
2006 establishments in Germany